Manlio Rho (1901 – 1957) was a painter born in Como, Italy. He is considered one of the most important abstract artists in Italy.

Life and work
In the late 1920s Manlio Rho was deeply involved in Como's engagement with the European abstract movement led by Wassily Kandinsky and Kazimir Malevich. Together with the architects Giuseppe Terragni, Alberto Sartoris, and the painter Mario Radice, he created the astrattisti comaschi, a group of artists that later included Aldo Galli, Carla Prina, and Carla Badiali. This event is widely regarded by critics as a pivotal moment in the history of Italian art of the 20th century.

Having worked initially in a figurative manner, he began abstract works in the early 1930s, showing a consistent preference for colour and the harmony of shapes.

The art of Rho is marked by a balance between strict geometry, similar to the "cold" abstractism of Russian suprematism, and a warmth considered typically North Italian. His works comprise flat geometric shapes glowing with lukewarm colours in a palette of greens, browns and orange.

In 1940 he signed the futurist manifesto Futuristi Primordiali Antonio Sant'Elia.

Shows
In 1935 he had his first important exhibition in the Milan art gallery Il Milione. His works have been shown at nine separate Venice Biennale from 1940 to 1986, and in numerous exhibitions around the world. In 2007 some of his works were included in two large exhibitions held in Milan's Royal Palace: Camera con vista and Kandinskji and Italian Abstract Art.

Rho's works can be found in the permanent collections of many modern art museums, including Milan, Trento and Rovereto, Trieste and Rome.

References
References in Italian

 Rho - Catalogo generale, Luciano Caramel, La Provincia editore, Como, 1990
 L'arte Contemporanea, da Cèzanne alle ultime tendenze, Renato Barilli, Feltrinelli, Milano, 1984, p. 246
 Storia della Pittura dal IV al XX secolo, a cura di C.L. Ragghianti, Istituto Geografico De Agostini, Novara, 1986, p. 220
 Storia dell'arte contemporanea in Italia, Renato Barilli, Bollati Boringhieri, Torino, 2007
 Peripezie del dopoguerra nell'arte Italiana, Adachiara Zevi, Einaudi, 2005
 l'arte del XX secolo, vol.II - La cultura artistica fra le due guerre - AA.VV. - Skira

References in Italian with English text

 Camera Con Vista, Catalogo della Mostra - Palazzo Reale, Milano, 2007
 Kandinskij e l'astrattismo italiano, Catalogo della Mostra - Palazzo Reale, Milano, 2007

External links
 Some of Manlio Rho works by Caldarelli's gallery archive

Sources
 This article draws from the corresponding article in the Italian Wikipedia.

20th-century Italian painters
Italian male painters
People from Como
1901 births
1957 deaths
20th-century Italian male artists